Bửu Long is a ward located in Biên Hòa city of Đồng Nai province, Vietnam. It has an area of about 5.7km2 and the population in 2017 was 31,861.

Trấn Biên Temple of Literature (Văn Miếu Trấn Biên) located in Bửu Long ward.

References

Bien Hoa